"Crosstown Traffic" is a song written by Jimi Hendrix and recorded by the Jimi Hendrix Experience for their third album, Electric Ladyland (1968). It was released as a single after "All Along the Watchtower", reaching number 52 on the US Billboard Hot 100 and number 37 on the UK Singles Chart.

Background
Unlike many of the tracks on the album, this recording features the full line-up of the Experience with Hendrix, Noel Redding, and Mitch Mitchell. Hendrix also plays a makeshift kazoo made with a comb and tissue paper in tandem at points with his lead guitar, and backing vocals are performed by Redding along with Dave Mason.  With its hard rock riff, the song is an example and mixture of blues and acid rock.

Reception
Billboard described the single as a "pulsating swinger" that "will make a powerful chart dent."  Cash Box described it as an "explosive session" with "massive instrumental impact and a heavy vocal."

References

1968 songs
1968 singles
The Jimi Hendrix Experience songs
Songs about New York City
Songs written by Jimi Hendrix
Reprise Records singles
Track Records singles
Song recordings produced by Jimi Hendrix